FuSe Pattern ( 拂色图 ) is a work
for piccolo, flute and violin, composed by He Xuntian in 1997.

Summary
He Xuntian adopted RD Composition and SS Composition in his work FuSe Pattern (trio).

Inspiration
FuSe Pattern (trio) was inspired from Xuntian He's ideology:
Primordial music for all species.
Humanity's first gift of sound to all species.

Making no distinction between ancient and modern;
no distinction between north, south, east and west;
no distinction between above and below, left and right;
no distinction between primary and secondary positions;
no distinction between beginning and end.

First performance 
FuSe Pattern (trio) for piccolo, flute and violin.
4. August 2000 Yokohama (J) 21st Asian Composers League Conference and Festival 2000 
Shanghai New Music Ensemble.

References

External links
FuSe Pattern published by Schott Musik International, Germany

Compositions by He Xuntian
Chamber music compositions
Compositions for piccolo
Compositions for flute
Compositions for violin
1997 compositions